Mokrý Lom is a municipality and village in České Budějovice District in the South Bohemian Region of the Czech Republic. It has about 100 inhabitants.

Administrative parts
Hamlets of Lahuť and Polžov are administrative parts of Mokrý Lom.

References

Villages in České Budějovice District